Gordon Muchall (born 2 November 1982) is a former English professional cricketer. He was a right-handed batsman and a right arm medium pace bowler. He was born in Newcastle upon Tyne and played for Durham County Cricket Club for the entire duration of his career before retiring at the end of the 2016 season.

He made his first-class debut in 2002 for Durham against Middlesex. He represented England Under-19's, and was a member of the first England Academy squad.

He was awarded his county cap in 2005.

External links

1982 births
Living people
English cricketers
Durham cricketers
People educated at Durham School
Cricketers from Newcastle upon Tyne
Durham Cricket Board cricketers
Northumberland cricketers